Jaden Hatwell (born 1 December 1977) is a New Zealand cricketer. He played in three first-class and nine List A matches for Northern Districts from 2001 to 2004.

See also
 List of Northern Districts representative cricketers

References

External links
 

1977 births
Living people
New Zealand cricketers
Northern Districts cricketers
Cricketers from Hamilton, New Zealand